Muhammad Safawi bin Rasid (born 5 March 1997) is a Malaysian professional footballer who plays for Thai League 1 side Ratchaburi, on loan from Malaysia Super League club Johor Darul Ta'zim, and the Malaysia national team. He mostly plays as a winger but he can also play as a striker. He is known for his free kick ability to curl the ball and ability to conjure curving long-range strikes.

Early life

Safawi lives in Kampung Bukit Chatak, Dungun and attended school at Sekolah Menengah Kebangsaan Seri Dungun, Dungun, Terengganu in 2010 before moving to Sekolah Sukan Bukit Nenas, Setiu, Terengganu to improve his football talent until 2014. He had played football for his school team since his first year of being a secondary school student.

Safawi has 13 siblings and most of them are involved with sports such as sepak takraw, football, and hockey. His two younger brother Syakir played for Terengganu F.C. III, and Alfi played for Kedah.

He is the ninth sibling and the pride of the Dungun people.

Club career

Youth career
By 2011, T-Team had established a football academy all over six Terengganu cities, Dungun, Marang, Besut, Kemaman, Setiu and Kuala Terengganu by their 2011 head coach, Jibang Marzuki. All the football academy players must be below 18 years old and Jibang Marzuki managed to hold a game for each team every week to ensure the best performance before going to T-Team Football Club pre-selection at the end of the year.

Safawi Rasid, who was only 15 years old when he joined the Dungun T-Team Football Club Academy, always made the first-eleven for his team on each game. He used to play as a central midfielder and loved scoring long-range shots with his left foot. His manager at the time, recalls going to his house and forcing him to attend training as he believed that Safawi had a bright future ahead. Since then, Safawi represented Terengganu's football team each year for the MSSM tournament.

When he was 16 years old, he moved to Sekolah Sukan Bukit Nenas to improve his football skills, 66 kilometres away from home. Due to his fantastic talent at the Sports School League, T-Team coach, Rahmad Darmawan selected him to attend training with the first team. Safawi quickly impressed Rahmad and soon became an integral part of the first team.

T-Team
At the age of 17, Safawi made his professional debut in the 2014 Malaysia Cup against Selangor on 13 August 2014.

Johor Darul Ta'zim
In December 2016, it was announced that Safawi had agreed to sign with champions Johor Darul Ta'zim. He was assigned the number 29.

2017 season
On 7 February 2017, Safawi featured in the 2017 AFC Champions League qualifying play-offs against Gamba Osaka which his side lost 0–3. On 27 January 2017, Safawi made his league debut in a 3–1 win over Felda United after coming off from the bench.

On 15 July 2017, he scored his first goal in the Malaysian Super League for his new club in a 3–1 victory against Sarawak. At the end of the season, Safawi picked up his first Malaysia Super League and 2017 Malaysia Cup medal, helping Johor Darul Ta'zim win their 4th consecutive league title and first Malaysia Cup in their history.

2018 season
During the 2018 AFC Cup group stage, Safawi showed an impressive performance in a 3–0 victory over Persija Jakarta, scoring a stunner along the way. On 17 March, he scored his first hat-trick in a 2–3 victory in the third round of the 2018 Malaysia FA Cup against UiTM. On 14 April 2018, he scored his first goal of the Malaysian Super League season against PKNS.

2019 season

During the 2019 AFC Champions League group stages Safawi scored a curler goal against China based team Shandong Luneng that made him win the AFC Goal of the Decade.

2020 season: Loan to Portimonense
Safawi joined Portuguese Primeira Liga club Portimonense S.C. from Johor Darul Ta'zim on a season long loan. He made his debut for the U-23 side on 16 October 2020, which ended in a 3-1 loss against Sporting CP U-23. The loan was cut short at the end of December 2020 because of lack of playing time given by the coach, making Safawi leave without any first team appearances.

2021 season

During the opening match of Malaysia Super League against Kedah in Piala Sumbangsih he scored his goal for the club after return from loan spell in Portugal. However, in the next match Safawi injured his knee, making him out for three months.

2022-23 season: Loan to Ratchaburi
On 4 December 2022, Ratchaburi FC chairman Tanawat Nitikanchana has announced that the club have signed Safawi during the 2022/23 Thai League transfer window. He made his debut for the team on 21 January 2023, which ended in a 2-0 loss against Khon Kaen United F.C.. On 19 March in his nine appearances in the league , Safawi net his first goal in  
Thai League 1 in 2-1 win against Chonburi.

International career
Safawi made his debut for the Malaysia Under-22 in the 2016 Nations Cup. In August 2016, Safawi was called up to the Malaysian national team for the match against Indonesia. He made his debut for the senior team in the match as a starter, as Malaysia lost 0–3. He was then called up again for the 2016 Causeway Challenge against rivals, Singapore, which ended 0–0.

Before the start of the 2016 AFF Suzuki Cup, Safawi was omitted from the final 23-man squad. The demotion of Safawi from Ong Kim Swee was heavily criticized by Malaysian football fans despite veteran striker, Safee Sali managing to be in the squad despite having a poor season earlier with Johor Darul Ta'zim.

During the 2017 Southeast Asian games, Safawi was selected for the 20-man squad by Ong Kim Swee. He scored the first goal of the tournament with a stunning volley from a cross by his fellow countryman Matthew Davies in a 2–1 victory against Brunei. Safawi scored his second goal of the tournament during the 3–1 victory against Myanmar. Despite receiving the silver medal after losing 1–0 during the final against Thailand, Safawi was one of the best players of the tournament and showed consistent performances throughout the tournament.

On 10 November 2017 Safawi scored his first international goal in the 2019 AFC Asian Cup qualification against  North Korea national football team.

During Football at the 2018 Asian Games - Men's tournament at the 2018 Asian Games in Jakarta-Palembang, Indonesia. Safawi was also selected for the 20-man squad by Ong Kim Swee. On 17 August, when Malaysia was playing against South Korea, he scored twice to secure a 2–1 win in their second the group match.

In November 2018, Safawi was called up to the Malaysia national squad for the 2018 AFF Championship. Safawi scored one goal in the tournament, against Vietnam in the final first leg.

On 9 December 2021, he scored his first international hat-trick in a 4–0 win over Laos in the 2020 AFF Suzuki Cup group stage.

Safawi is also part of the Malaysian team that qualified for the 2023 AFC Asian Cup. He played  all 3 matches against Turkmenistan, Bahrain and Bangladesh in Third Round Group E Qualification.

Career statistics

Club

International appearances

International goals

Senior
Scores and results list Malaysia's goal tally first.

Malaysia Under-23

Honours
JDT
 Malaysia Super League: 2017, 2018, 2019, 2020, 2021, 2022
 Malaysia Cup: 2017, 2019, 2022
 Piala Sumbangsih: 2018, 2019, 2020, 2021, 2022
 Malaysia FA Cup: 2022

Malaysia U-23
 Southeast Asian Games Silver Medal: 2017
Malaysia
 AFF Championship runners up: 2018
King's Cup runner-up: 2022

Individual
 AFF Championship Top Scorer: 2020
 AFC Champions League Goal Of The Decade: 2020
 Malaysia Cup Top Scorer: 2019
 Malaysia Cup Best Player: 2019
 FourFourTwo ASEAN Young player of the year: 2018
 Malaysia Football League Most Promising Player: 2016, 2018 
 Malaysia Football League Best Eleven: 2018, 2019
 Malaysia Football League Best Midfielder: 2018
 Malaysia Football League Best Striker: 2019
 Malaysia Football League Most Popular Player: 2019
 Malaysia Football League Most Valuable Player: 2018, 2019 
2018 AFF Championship: Best Eleven

References

External links
 Safawi Rasid website
 

1997 births
Living people
Malaysian footballers
Malaysia international footballers
Terengganu F.C. II players
Johor Darul Ta'zim F.C. players
Portimonense S.C. players
Malaysia Super League players
Malaysian people of Malay descent
Safawi Rasid
Safawi Rasid
People from Terengganu
Association football wingers
Southeast Asian Games silver medalists for Malaysia
Southeast Asian Games medalists in football
Footballers at the 2018 Asian Games
Competitors at the 2017 Southeast Asian Games
Asian Games competitors for Malaysia
Malaysian expatriate footballers
Expatriate footballers in Portugal
Malaysia youth international footballers